The University of the Virgin Islands Research and Technology Park (RTPark) is the first independent research and e-technology park located in the U.S. Virgin Islands (USVI).  Launched in 2002, RTPark is the first government-sponsored public-private collaboration for technology development in the USVI. It was formed as a public corporation by the government of the U.S. Virgin Islands and is headquartered on the St. Croix campus of the University of the Virgin Islands. The goal of the RTPark is to develop the USVI technology community to generate long-term economic growth in the islands, by serving as a center for e-commerce and technology for transaction-oriented, knowledge-based businesses.

History 
Following a feasibility study and public input forums, Governor Charles Wesley Turnbull signed Act 6502 to establish RTPark in 2002. Created as a public corporation, it was formed to encourage growth in both economic development and technology for the USVI. Via a Protected Cell Corporation function as part of RTPark's legislative charter, tax incentives can be extended to knowledge-based businesses that apply and are approved as RTPark tenants. The legislation for RTPark can be found in Title 17, Chapters 34 and 43 of the U.S. Virgin Islands Code.

Management and governance 
The executive director, Peter Chapman, manages day-to-day operations and reports to a seven-member Board of Directors. Board members include:

 The Chair of the University of the Virgin Islands (UVI) Board of Trustees 
 The President of UVI
 Two additional UVI Board of Trustees members
 Three members appointed by the Governor of the U.S. Virgin Islands

Technology and business offerings  
The park offers two main categories of offerings for tenants: 1) E-commerce and technology services and 2) business operation and tax benefits.

E-commerce and technology services can include:
 Co-location data centers
 Web hosting 
 Tier-1 connectivity
 E-commerce payment and transaction processing
 Electronic data interchange and digital supply transactions
 Related data communication services including e-mail, document management, voice and data transmission
Database services and products

 Online services including remote work technology, telemedicine, education and information research

Business operation and tax benefits can include:

 Intellectual property rights under the protection of the United States
 Protections under U.S. federal laws  the same as operating in the United States
 Corporate tax incentives
 Research and development services including public/private collaboration and intellectual property licensing
 Business incubation services for startups and emerging companies
 Business center services with access to trained workers that can provide customer support, data entry and record management, digital content authoring and publishing, and software development

Facilities and providers  
High capacity broadband connectivity and collocation space are available via the USVI global subsea Tier-1 fiber network switching facilities of AT&T and Level 3 (previously Global Crossing), which operate hubs on St. Thomas and St. Croix.

Managed services (including collocation and data center services) as well as global connectivity provisioning, billing, and other support are available via Adveniat, a local subsidiary of Baltimore Technology Park.

RTPark also has an alliance with JetPay, which provides “card not present” transaction processing services for merchants, as well as related bank card processing services.

References

External links 
University of the Virgin Islands Research and Technology Park (RTPark) website
RTPark on E-Commerce Island website
University of the Virgin Islands website

Science parks in the United States
University of the Virgin Islands
2002 establishments in the United States Virgin Islands